Henri IV was a pre-dreadnought battleship of the French Navy built to test some of the ideas of the prominent naval architect Louis-Émile Bertin. She began World War I as guardship at Bizerte. She was sent to reinforce the Allied naval force in the Dardanelles campaign of 1915, although some of her secondary armament had been removed for transfer to Serbia in 1914. Afterwards, she was relegated to second-line roles before being sent to Taranto as a depot ship in 1918. She was struck from the navy list in 1920 and scrapped the following year.

Design
Henri IV was designed by the famous French naval architect Louis-Émile Bertin to evaluate some of his ideas. She was designed to make her a small target and lacked most of the normal rear superstructure common to ships of her period, other than that needed to keep her rear turret from being washed out. Her rear hull had only  of freeboard, although she was built up to the normal upper deck height amidships and at the bow for better sea-keeping and to provide for her crew. Her superstructure was narrow and recessed from the hull above the main deck.

General characteristics
Henri IV was smaller than her predecessors, at  overall. She was significantly lighter than the Charlemagne-class battleships and displaced only  normally, some  less than the earlier ships. Her crew consisted of 26 officers and 438 enlisted men.

Propulsion
Henri IV had three vertical triple-expansion steam engines, each driving one propeller shaft.

Armament
Henri IV carried her main armament of two 40-caliber  Canon de 274 modèle 1893/1896s in two single-gun turrets, one forward on the upper deck and the other on the main deck at the rear.

The ship's secondary armament consisted of seven 45-caliber  Canon de 138 mm Modèle 1893 naval guns. Four were mounted in individual casemates on the main deck; two more were mounted on the shelter deck with gun shields and the last gun was mounted in a shelter deck turret superfiring over the rear main gun turret. This was the first superfiring turret in naval history and, in this case, was not very successful because the barrel of the 138 mm gun was too short to clear the sighting hood of the turret below.

Twelve  40-caliber Canon de 47 mm Modèle 1885 Hotchkiss guns were mounted as anti-torpedo boat guns. They were mounted in platforms in the foremast and mainmast and on the superstructure. Their theoretical maximum rate of fire was fifteen rounds per minute, but only seven rounds per minute sustained. Two submerged  torpedo tubes were also carried.

Armor
The belt ended short of the stern in a  traverse bulkhead. This system was based on experiments conducted in 1894 and was more modern than that used in the Russian battleship Tsesarevich although it was still too close to the side of the ship.

Construction and service
Henri IV was laid down at Cherbourg on 15 July 1897 and launched on 23 August 1899, but did not enter service until September 1903, at a cost of ₣15,660,000 francs. By 1911, Henri IV was assigned as the guard ship of the French naval base in Tunis in French Tunisia.

The ship spent the early part of World War I as the guardship at Bizerte, until February 1915 when she was assigned to the newly formed Syrian Squadron (escadre de Syrie). This squadron was intended to attack Turkish positions and lines of communication in Syria, Lebanon, Palestine and the Sinai Peninsula. Henri IV was transferred to the French squadron in the Dardanelles campaign to replace the sunk battleship  and the damaged  after the Allies suffered heavily during their first attempt to sail through the Dardanelles and past the fortifications on 18 March 1915. The ship bombarded Kum Kale, on the Asiatic side of the Dardanelles in support of the French diversionary landing on 25 April 1915, and provided fire support for the troops ashore for the rest of the month. She was hit eight times while providing support during this time.

Three of her 138.6 mm guns had been dismounted by November 1914 and sent to reinforce the French naval mission to Serbia, known as "Mission D", by rail from Salonica. In 1916, she was assigned to the Complementary (Reserve) Division of the 3rd Battle Squadron. Subsequently she served with the French Eastern Division in Egypt and then she was sent to Taranto in 1918 as a depot ship. Henri IV was stricken from the Navy List in 1920 and scrapped the following year.

Notes

References

External links

 picture gallery of Henri IV

Ships built in France
World War I battleships of France
Battleships of the French Navy
1899 ships